The Oreshkovo airfield is an air base in Russia located 2 km southeast of Vorotynsk.  It was a military base with Mi-8 helicopters. The military airfield was closed in 2013 after the last unit stationed there, the 45th Independent Helicopter Regiment, was transferred to Vyazma in 2010.

References
 RussianAirFields.com

Soviet Air Force bases